The General Popular Radical Union was a coalition of three Greek political parties for the elections of 1936.

Members to the coalition were:
 National Radical Party
 National People's Party
 Party of Independent Populars

Defunct political party alliances in Greece